Climate change mitigation is action to limit climate change by reducing emissions of greenhouse gases or removing those gases from the atmosphere. The recent rise in global average temperature is mostly caused by emissions from fossil fuels burning (coal, oil, and natural gas). Mitigation can reduce emissions by transitioning to sustainable energy sources, conserving energy, and increasing efficiency. In addition,  can be removed from the atmosphere by enlarging forests, restoring wetlands and using other natural and technical processes, which are grouped together under the term of carbon sequestration.

Solar energy and wind power have the highest climate change mitigation potential at lowest cost compared to a range of other options. Variable availability of sunshine and wind is addressed by energy storage and improved electrical grids, including long-distance electricity transmission, demand management and diversification of renewables. As low-carbon power is more widely available, transportation and heating can increasingly rely on these sources. Energy efficiency is improved using heat pumps and electric vehicles. If industrial processes must create carbon dioxide, carbon capture and storage can reduce net emissions.

Greenhouse gas emissions from agriculture include methane as well as nitrous oxide. Emissions from agriculture can be mitigated by reducing food waste, switching to a more plant-based diet, by protecting ecosystems and by improving farming processes.

Climate change mitigation policies include: carbon pricing by carbon taxes and carbon emission trading, easing regulations for renewable energy deployment, reductions of fossil fuel subsidies, and divestment from fossil fuels, and subsidies for clean energy. Current policies are estimated to produce global warming of about 2.7 °C by 2100. This warming is significantly above the 2015 Paris Agreement's goal of limiting global warming to well below 2 °C and preferably to 1.5 °C. Globally, limiting warming to 2 °C may result in higher benefits than costs.

Definitions and scope 
The overall aim of climate change mitigation—to sustain ecosystems so that human civilisation can be maintained—requires that greenhouse gas emissions be cut drastically. Accordingly, the Intergovernmental Panel on Climate Change (IPCC) defines mitigation (of climate change) as "a human intervention to reduce emissions or enhance the sinks of greenhouse gases".

Some publications describe solar radiation management (SRM)—solar geoengineering—as a climate mitigation technology. Unrelated to greenhouse gas mitigation, SRM would work by changing the way Earth receives solar radiation. Examples include reducing the amount of sunlight reaching the surface, reducing optical thickness and cloud lifetime, and changing surface reflectivity. The IPCC describes SRM as a "climate risk reduction strategy" or "supplementary option" but not as a climate mitigation option.

Mitigation measures can be approached in parallel, as there is no single pathway to limit global warming to 1.5 or 2 °C. Such measures can be categorized as follows:
 Sustainable energy and sustainable transport
 Energy conservation (this includes efficient energy use)
 For agricultural production and industrial processes: sustainable agriculture and green industrial policy
 Enhancing carbon sinks: Carbon dioxide removal (this includes carbon sequestration)
Carbon dioxide removal (CDR) is defined as "Anthropogenic activities removing carbon dioxide from the atmosphere and durably storing it in geological, terrestrial, or ocean reservoirs, or in products. It includes existing and potential anthropogenic enhancement of biological or geochemical  sinks and direct air carbon dioxide capture and storage (DACCS), but excludes natural  uptake not directly caused by human activities."

The terminology in this area is still evolving. The term geoengineering (or climate engineering) is sometimes used in the scientific literature for both CDR or SRM (solar radiation management), if the techniques are used at a global scale. The terms geoengineering or climate engineering are no longer used in IPCC reports.

Co-benefits 

There are also co-benefits of climate change mitigation. For example, in the transport sector, possible co-benefits of mitigation strategies include: air quality improvements, health benefits, and more public transport options. The increased use of green and blue infrastructure can reduce the urban heat island effect and therefore heat stress on people. Climate change mitigation might also lead to less inequality and poverty.

Climate change adaptation

Some mitigation measures have co-benefits in the area of climate change adaptation. This is for example the case for many nature-based solutions. Examples in the urban context include urban green and blue infrastructure which provide mitigation as well as adaptation benefits. This can be in the form of urban forests and street trees, green roofs and walls, urban agriculture and so forth. The mitigation is achieved through the conservation and expansion of carbon sinks and reduced energy use of buildings. Adaptation benefits are provided for example through reduced heat stress and flooding risk.

Health
Mitigation measures may have many health co-benefits – potential measures can not only mitigate future health impacts from climate change but also improve health directly. Globally the cost of limiting warming to 2 °C is less than the value of the extra years of life due to cleaner air - and in India and China much less. Air quality improvement is a near-term benefit among the many societal benefits from climate change mitigation, including substantial health benefits. Studies suggest that demand-side climate change mitigation solutions have largely beneficial effects on 18 constituents of well-being.

Emission trends and pledges 

Greenhouse gas emissions from human activities strengthen the greenhouse effect, contributing to climate change. Most is carbon dioxide from burning fossil fuels: coal, oil, and natural gas. Human-caused emissions have increased atmospheric carbon dioxide by about 50% over pre-industrial levels. Emissions in the 2010s averaged 56 billion tons a year,  higher than ever before. In 2016, energy (electricity, heat and transport) was responsible for 73.2% of GHG emissions, direct industrial processes for 5.2%, waste for 3.2% and agriculture, forestry and land use for 18.4%.

Electricity generation and transport are major emitters: the largest single source is coal-fired power stations with 20% of greenhouse gas emissions. Deforestation and other changes in land use also emit carbon dioxide and methane. The largest sources of anthropogenic methane emissions are agriculture, and gas venting and fugitive emissions from the fossil-fuel industry. The largest agricultural methane source is livestock. Agricultural soils emit nitrous oxide, partly due to fertilizers. The problem of fluorinated gases from refrigerants has been politically solved now so many countries have ratified the Kigali Amendment.

Carbon dioxide is the dominant emitted greenhouse gas, while methane emissions almost have the same short-term impact. Nitrous oxide (N2O) and fluorinated gases (F-Gases) play a minor role. Livestock and manure produce 5.8% of all greenhouse gas emissions, although this depends on the time horizon used for the global warming potential of the respective gas.

Greenhouse gas (GHG) emissions are measured in  equivalents determined by their global warming potential (GWP), which depends on their lifetime in the atmosphere. There are widely-used greenhouse gas accounting methods that convert volumes of methane, nitrous oxide and other greenhouse gases to carbon dioxide equivalents. Estimations largely depend on the ability of oceans and land sinks to absorb these gases. Short-lived climate pollutants (SLCPs) including methane, hydrofluorocarbons (HFCs), tropospheric ozone and black carbon persist in the atmosphere for a period ranging from days to 15 years, whereas carbon dioxide can remain in the atmosphere for millennia.

Satellites are increasingly being used for locating and measuring greenhouse gas emissions and deforestation. Earlier, scientists largely relied on or calculated estimates of greenhouse gas emissions and governments' self-reported data.

Needed emissions cuts 

The annual "Emissions Gap Report" by UNEP stated in 2022: "To get on track for limiting global warming to 1.5°C, global annual GHG emissions must be reduced by 45 per cent compared with emissions projections under policies currently in place in just eight years, and they must continue to decline rapidly after 2030, to avoid exhausting the limited remaining atmospheric carbon budget." The report also commented that the world should focus on "broad-based economy-wide transformations" instead of focusing on incremental change.

In 2022, the Intergovernmental Panel on Climate Change (IPCC) released its Sixth Assessment Report on climate change, warning that greenhouse gas emissions must peak before 2025 at the latest and decline 43% by 2030, in order to likely limit global warming to 1.5 °C (2.7 °F). Secretary-general of the United Nations, António Guterres, clarified that for this "Main emitters must drastically cut emissions starting this year".

Pledges 
Climate Action Tracker described the situation on 9 November 2021 as follows: the global temperature will rise by 2.7 °C by the end of the century with current policies and by 2.9 °C with nationally adopted policies. The temperature will rise by 2.4 °C if only the pledges for 2030 are implemented, by 2.1 °C if the long-term targets are also achieved. If all the announced targets are fully achieved the rise in global temperature will peak at 1.9 °C and go down to 1.8 °C by the year 2100. All the information about all climate pledges is sent to the Global Climate Action Portal - Nazca. The scientific community is checking their fulfillment.

While the status of most goals set for 2020 have not been evaluated in a definitive and detailed way or reported on by the media, the world failed to meet most or all international goals set for that year.

As the 2021 United Nations Climate Change Conference occurred in Glasgow, the group of researchers running the Climate Action Tracker reported that of countries responsible for 85% of greenhouse gas emissions, only four polities (responsible for 6% of global greenhouse gas emissions) – EU, UK, Chile and Costa Rica – have published a detailed official policyplan that describes the steps and ways by which 2030 mitigation targets could be realized.

Emissions and economic growth 
Some have said that economic growth is a key driver of CO2 emissions. However later (in late 2022) others have said that economic growth no longer means higher emissions. As the economy expands, demand for energy and energy-intensive goods increases, pushing up CO2 emissions. On the other hand, economic growth may drive technological change and increase energy efficiency. Economic growth may be associated with specialization in certain economic sectors. If specialization is in energy-intensive sectors, specifically carbon energy sources, then there will be a strong link between economic growth and emissions growth. If specialization is in less energy-intensive sectors, e.g. the services sector, then there might be a weak link between economic growth and emissions growth.

Much of the literature focuses on the "environmental Kuznets curve" (EKC) hypothesis, which posits that at early stages of development, pollution per capita and GDP per capita move in the same direction. Beyond a certain income level, emissions per capita will decrease as GDP per capita increase, thus generating an inverted-U shaped relationship between GDP per capita and pollution. However, the econometrics literature did not support either an optimistic interpretation of the EKC hypothesis – i.e., that the problem of emissions growth will solve itself – or a pessimistic interpretation – i.e., that economic growth is irrevocably linked to emissions growth. Instead, it was suggested that there was some degree of flexibility between economic growth and emissions growth.

Low-carbon power 

Most scenarios and strategies expect to see a major increase in the use of renewable energy in combination with increased energy efficiency measures. The deployment of renewable energy would have to be accelerated six-foldthough to keep global warming under 2 °C. 

The competitiveness of renewable energy is a key to a rapid deployment. In 2020, onshore wind and solar photovoltaics were the cheapest source for new bulk electricity generation in many regions. Although renewables may have higher storage costs non-renewables may have higher cleanup costs. A carbon price can increase the competitiveness of renewable energy.

Solar and wind energy 

Wind and sun can be sources for large amounts of low-carbon energy at competitive production costs. The IPCC estimates that these two mitigation options have the largest emission reduction potential before 2030 at low cost.

Solar photovoltaics (PV) has become the cheapest way to generate electricity in many regions of the world. The growth of photovoltaics has been close to exponential and has about doubled every three years since the 1990s. A different technology is concentrated solar power (CSP) using mirrors or lenses to concentrate a large area of sunlight onto a receiver. With CSP, the energy can be stored for a few hours, providing supply in the evening. Solar water heating doubled between 2010 and 2019.
Regions in the higher northern and southern latitudes have the highest potential for wind power. Offshore wind farms are more expensive but the units deliver more energy per installed capacity with less fluctuations. In most regions, wind power generation is higher in the winter when PV output is low; for this reason, combinations of wind and solar power lead to better-balanced systems.

Other renewables 
Other well-established renewable energy forms include hydropower, bioenergy and geothermal energy:

 Hydroelectricity is electricity generated by hydropower and plays a leading role in countries like Brazil, Norway and China. but there are geographical limits and environmental issues. Tidal power can be used in coastal regions.
 Bioenergy can provide energy for electricity, heat and transport. Bioenergy, in particular biogas, can provide dispatchable electricity generation. While burning plant-derived biomass releases , the plants withdraw  from the atmosphere while they grow. How a fuel is produced, transported and processed has a significant impact on lifecycle emissions. Renewable biofuels are starting to be used in aviation.
 Geothermal power is electrical power generated from geothermal energy. Geothermal electricity generation is currently used in 26 countries, while geothermal heating is in use in 70 countries.

Integrating variable renewable energy 

Wind and solar power production does not consistently match demand. To deliver reliable electricity from variable renewable energy sources such as wind and solar, electrical power systems require flexibility. Most electrical grids were constructed for non-intermittent energy sources such as coal-fired power plants. As larger amounts of solar and wind energy are integrated into the grid, changes have to be made to the energy system to ensure that the supply of electricity is matched to demand. 

There are various ways to make the electricity system more flexible. In many places, wind and solar generation are complementary on a daily and a seasonal scale: there is more wind during the night and in winter when solar energy production is low. Linking different geographical regions through long-distance transmission lines allows for further cancelling out of variability. Energy demand can be shifted in time through energy demand management and the use of smart grids, matching the times when variable energy production is highest. Further flexibility could be provided from sector coupling, that is coupling the electricity sector to the heat and mobility sector via power-to-heat-systems and electric vehicles.

Building overcapacity for wind and solar generation can help ensure that enough electricity is produced even during poor weather. In optimal weather, energy generation may have to be curtailed if excess electricity cannot be used or stored.

Energy storage helps overcome barriers to intermittent renewable energy. The most commonly used and available storage method is pumped-storage hydroelectricity, which requires locations with large differences in height and access to water. Batteries, especially lithium-ion batteries, are also deployed widely. Batteries typically store electricity for short periods. The cost and low energy density of batteries makes them impractical for the large energy storage needed to balance inter-seasonal variations in energy production. Pumped hydro storage with capacity for multi-month usage has been implemented in some locations.

Nuclear power 

Nuclear power could complement renewables for electricity. On the other hand, environmental and security risks could outweigh the benefits.

The construction of new nuclear reactors currently takes about 10 years, substantially longer than scaling up the deployment of wind and solar, and there are credit risks. However they are thought to be much cheaper in China, and the country is building a significant number of new power plants.  the cost of extending nuclear power plant lifetimes is competitive with other electricity generation technologies, including new solar and wind projects.

Replacing coal by natural gas

Mitigation by sector

Buildings 

The buildings sector accounts for 23% of global energy-related  emissions. About half of the energy is used for space and water heating. Building insulation can reduce the primary energy demand significantly. Heat pump loads may also provide a flexible resource that can participate in demand response to integrate variable renewable resources into the grid. Solar water heating uses the thermal energy directly. Sufficiency measures include moving to smaller houses when the needs of households change, mixed use of spaces and the collective use of devices. New buildings can be constructed using passive solar building design, low-energy building, or zero-energy building techniques. In addition, it is possible to design buildings that are more energy-efficient to cool by using lighter-coloured, more reflective materials in the development of urban areas.

Heat pumps efficiently heat buildings, and cool them by air conditioning. A modern heat pump typically transports around three to five times more thermal energy than electrical energy consumed, depending on the coefficient of performance and the outside temperature. 

Refrigeration and air conditioning account for about 10% of global  emissions caused by fossil fuel-based energy production and the use of fluorinated gases. Alternative cooling systems, such as passive cooling building design and installing passive daytime radiative cooling surfaces, can reduce air conditioning use. Suburbs and cities in hot and arid climates can significantly reduce energy consumption from cooling with daytime radiative cooling.

The energy consumption for cooling is expected to rise significantly due to increasing heat and availability of devices in poorer countries. Of the 2.8 billion people living in the hottest parts of the world, only 8% currently have air conditioners, compared with 90% of people in the US and Japan. By combining energy efficiency improvements with the transition away from super-polluting refrigerants, the world could avoid cumulative greenhouse gas emissions of up to 210–460 Gte over the next four decades.

A shift to renewable energy in the cooling sector comes with two advantages: Solar energy production with mid-day peaks corresponds with the load required for cooling. Additionally, cooling has a large potential for load management in the electric grid.

Transport 

Transportation emissions account for 15% of emissions worldwide. Increasing the use of public transport, low-carbon freight transport and cycling are important components of transport decarbonization.

Electric vehicles and environmentally friendly rail help to reduce the consumption of fossil fuels. In most cases, electric trains are more efficient than air transport and truck transport.
Other efficiency means include improved public transport, smart mobility, carsharing and electric hybrids. Fossil-fuel for passenger cars can be included in emissions trading. Furthermore, moving away from a car-dominated transport system towards low-carbon advanced public transport system is important.

Heavyweight, large personal vehicles (such as cars) require a lot of energy to move and take up much urban space. Several alternatives modes of transport are available to replace these. The European Union has made smart mobility part of its European Green Deal and in smart cities, smart mobility is also important.
The World Bank is supporting lower income countries to buy electric buses, as although their purchase price is higher than diesel buses this can be offset through lower running costs, and health improvements due to cleaner air in cities.

Between a quarter and three-quarters of cars on the road by 2050 are forecast to be electric vehicles. Hydrogen may be a solution for long-distance heavy freight trucks, if batteries alone are too heavy.

Shipping 

In the shipping industry, the use of liquefied natural gas (LNG) as a marine bunker fuel is driven by emissions regulations. Ship operators have to switch from heavy fuel oil to more expensive oil-based fuels, implement costly flue gas treatment technologies or switch to LNG engines. Methane slip, when gas leaks unburned through the engine, lowers the advantages of LNG.
Maersk, the largest container shipping line and vessel operator in the world, warns of stranded assets when investing into transitional fuels like LNG. The company lists green ammonia as one of the preferred fuel types of the future and has announced the first carbon-neutral vessel on the water by 2023, running on carbon-neutral methanol.  Partially hydrogen-powered ships are being trialled for cruises.

Hybrid and all electric ferries are suitable for short distances. Norway's goal is an all electric fleet by 2025.

Air transport 

Jet airliners contribute to climate change by emitting carbon dioxide, the best understood greenhouse gas, and, with less scientific understanding, nitrogen oxides, contrails and particulates. Their radiative forcing is estimated at 1.3–1.4 that of  alone, excluding induced cirrus cloud with a very low level of scientific understanding. In 2018, global commercial operations generated 2.4% of all  emissions.

While the aviation industry has become more fuel efficient, overall emissions have risen as the volume of air travel has increased. By 2020, aviation emissions were 70% higher than in 2005 and they could grow by 300% by 2050. 

Aviation biofuel, emissions trading and carbon offsetting, part of the 191 nation ICAO's Carbon Offsetting and Reduction Scheme for International Aviation (CORSIA), can lower  emissions. Aviation usage can be lowered by short-haul flight bans, train connections, personal choices and taxation on flights. Fuel-powered aircraft may be replaced by hybrid electric aircraft and electric aircraft or by hydrogen-powered aircraft.

In aviation, current 180 Mt of  emissions (11% of emissions in transport) are expected to rise in most projections, at least until 2040. Aviation biofuel and hydrogen can only cover a small proportion of flights in the coming years. The market entry for hybrid-driven aircraft on regional scheduled flights is projected after 2030, for battery-powered aircraft after 2035. Under CORSIA flight operators can purchase carbon offsets to cover their emissions above 2019 levels, CORSIA will be compulsory from 2027.

Agriculture, forestry and land use 

Almost 20% of greenhouse gas emissions come from the agriculture and forestry sector. Mitigation measures in the food system can be divided into four categories: demand-side changes, ecosystem protections, mitigation on farms, and mitigation in the supply chains. On the demand side, limiting food waste is an effective way to reduce food emissions. Furthermore, changes to a diet less reliant on animal products (especially plant-based diets), are effective.

With 21% of global methane emissions, cattle are a major driver of global warming. When rainforests are cut and the land is converted for grazing, the impact is even higher. This results in up to 335 kg CO2eq emissions to produce 1 kg beef in Brazil, when using a 30-year time horizon. Other livestock, manure management and rice cultivation also emit greenhouse gases, in addition to fossil fuel combustion in agriculture.

Important mitigation options for reducing the greenhouse gas emissions from livestock include genetic selection, introduction of methanotrophic bacteria into the rumen, vaccines, feeds, toilet-training, diet modification and grazing management. Other options include just using ruminant-free alternatives instead, such as milk substitutes and meat analogues. Non-ruminant livestock, such as poultry, emits far less.

Methane emissions in rice cultivation can be cut by implementing an improved water management, combining dry seeding and one drawdown, or a perfect execution of a sequence of wetting and drying. This results in emission reductions of up to 90% compared to full flooding and even increased yields.

Industry 

Industry is the largest emitter of greenhouse gases when direct and indirect emissions are included. Emissions from industry can be reduced by electrification and green hydrogen can play a major role in energy-intensive industries for which electricity is not an option. Further mitigation options involve the steel and cement industry, which can switch to a less polluting production process. Products can be made with less material to reduce emission-intensity and industrial processes can be made more efficient. Finally, circular economy measures reduce the need for new materials, which also saves on emissions that would have been released from the mining of collecting of those materials.

The decarbonisation of cement production requires new technologies to be developed, and therefore investment in innovation. Bioconcrete is one possibility to reduce emissions, but because no technology for mitigation is mature yet CCS will be needed at least in the short-term. Blast furnaces could be replaced by hydrogen direct reduced iron and electric arc furnaces.

Coal, gas and oil production often comes with significant methane leakage. In the early 2020s some governments recognized the scale of the problem and introduced regulations. Methane leaks at oil and gas wells and processing plants are cost-effective to fix in countries which can easily trade gas internationally. There are leaks in countries where gas is cheap; such as Iran, Russia, and Turkmenistan. Nearly all this can be stopped by replacing old components and preventing routine flaring. Coalbed methane may continue leaking even after the mine has been closed, but it can be captured by drainage and/or ventilation systems. Fossil fuel firms do not always have financial incentives to tackle methane leakage.

Preserving and enhancing carbon sinks 

To reduce pressures on ecosystems and enhance their carbon sequestration capabilities, changes are necessary in agriculture and forestry, such as preventing deforestation and restoring natural ecosystems by reforestation. Scenarios that limit global warming to 1.5 °C typically project the large-scale use of carbon dioxide removal methods over the 21st century. There are concerns though about over-reliance on these technologies, and environmental impacts. Nonetheless, the mitigation potential of ecosystem restoration and reduced conversion are among the mitigation tools that can yield the most emissions reductions before 2030.

Land-based mitigation options are referred to as "AFOLU mitigation options" in the 2022 IPCC report on mitigation. The abbreviation stands for "agriculture, forestry and other land use" The report described the economic mitigation potential from relevant activities around forests and ecosystems as follows: "the conservation, improved management, and restoration of forests and other ecosystems (coastal wetlands, peatlands, savannas and grasslands)". A high mitigation potential is found for reducing deforestation in tropical regions. The economic potential of these activities has been estimated to be 4.2 to 7.4 Giga tons of CO2 equivalents per year.

Forests 

The UK government's Stern Review on the economics of climate change stated already in 2007 that curbing deforestation was a "highly cost-effective way of reducing greenhouse gas emissions".

Mitigation measures in the area of forestry are slow and often have trade-offs with food prices and potential confounding spill-over effects on climate from indirect land use change.

Conservation

About 95% of deforestation occurs in the tropics, where it is mostly driven by the clearing of land for agriculture. One forest conservation strategy is transferring rights over land from public domain to its indigenous inhabitants.  Concessions to land often go to powerful extractive companies and conservation strategies that exclude and even evict humans, called "fortress conservation", often lead to more exploitation of the land as the native inhabitants then turn to work for extractive companies to survive.

Afforestation and reforestation 

Afforestation is the establishment of trees where there was previously no tree cover. Scenarios for new plantations covering up to 4000 Mha (6300 x 6300 km) calculate with a cumulative carbon storage of more than 900 GtC (2300 Gt) until 2100. However, these are not considered a viable alternative to aggressive emissions reduction, as the plantations would need to be so large, they would eliminate most natural ecosystems or reduce food production. One example is the Trillion Tree Campaign.
Reforestation is the restocking of existing depleted forests or where there was once recently forests. Reforestation could save at least 1GtCO2/year, at an estimated cost of $5–15/tCO2. Restoring all degraded forests all over the world could capture about 205 GtC (750 Gt). With increased intensive agriculture and urbanization, there is an increase in the amount of abandoned farmland. By some estimates, for every acre of original old-growth forest cut down, more than 50 acres of new secondary forests are growing. Promoting regrowth on abandoned farmland could offset years of carbon emissions.

Planting new trees can be expensive and a risky investment as, for example, about 80 percent of planted trees in the Sahel die within two years. Instead, helping native species sprout naturally is cheaper and they are more likely to survive, with even long deforested areas still containing an "underground forest" of living roots and tree stumps. This could include pruning and coppicing to accelerate growth and this also provides woodfuel, which is otherwise a major source of deforestation. Such practices, called farmer-managed natural regeneration, are centuries old but the biggest obstacle towards implementation is the ownership of the trees by the state, who often sell timber rights to businesses. This leads to seedlings being uprooted by locals who saw them as a liability. Legal aid for locals and changes to property law such as in Mali and Niger has led to what has been called the largest positive environmental transformation in Africa, with it being possible to discern from space the border between Niger and the more barren land in Nigeria, where the law has not changed.

Proforestation is promoting forests to capture their full ecological potential. This is a mitigation strategy as secondary forests that have regrown in abandoned farmland are found to have less biodiversity than the original old-growth forests and original forests store 60% more carbon than these new forests. Strategies include rewilding and establishing wildlife corridors.

Increasing soil carbon

There are many measures to increase soil carbon, which makes it complex and hard to measure and account for; an advantage is that there are fewer trade-offs for these measures than for BECCS or afforestation, for example.

Globally, protecting healthy soils and restoring the soil carbon sponge could remove 7.6 billion tons of carbon dioxide from the atmosphere annually, which is more than the annual emissions of the US. Trees capture  while growing above ground and exuding larger amounts of carbon below ground. Trees contribute to the building of a soil carbon sponge. The carbon formed above ground is released as  immediately when wood is burned. If dead wood remains untouched, only some of the carbon returns to the atmosphere as decomposition proceeds.

Methods that enhance carbon sequestration in soil include no-till farming, residue mulching and crop rotation, all of which are more widely used in organic farming than in conventional farming. Because only 5% of US farmland currently uses no-till and residue mulching, there is a large potential for carbon sequestration.

Farming can deplete soil carbon and render soil incapable of supporting life. However, conservation farming can protect carbon in soils, and repair damage over time. The farming practice of cover crops has been recognized as climate-smart agriculture. Best management practices for European soils were described to increase soil organic carbon: conversion of arable land to grassland, straw incorporation, reduced tillage, straw incorporation combined with reduced tillage, ley cropping system and cover crops.

Regenerative agriculture includes conservation tillage, diversity, rotation and cover crops, minimizing physical disturbance and supporting carbon sequestration in soils. It has other benefits like improving the state of the soil and consequently yields.

Another mitigation option is the production of biochar, the solid remaining after the pyrolysis of biomass, and its storage in soils. Biochar production releases half of the carbon from the biomass—either released into the atmosphere or captured with CCS—and retains most the other half in the stable biochar. It can endure in soil for thousands of years. Biochar may increase the soil fertility of acidic soils and increase agricultural productivity. During production of biochar, heat is released which may be used as bioenergy.

Wetland restoration 

Wetland restoration is an important mitigation measure which has moderate to big mitigation potential on a limited land area with low trade-offs and costs. Wetlands perform two important functions in relation to climate change. They can sequester carbon, converting carbon dioxide to solid plant material through photosynthesis, but they also store and regulate water. Wetlands store approximately 44.6 million tonnes of carbon per year globally.

Some wetlands are a significant source of methane emissions and some also emit nitrous oxide. Peatland globally covers just 3% of the land's surface but stores up to 550 gigatonnes of carbon, representing 42% of all soil carbon and exceeds the carbon stored in all other vegetation types, including the world's forests. The threat to peatlands include draining the areas for agriculture and cutting down trees for lumber as the trees help hold and fix the peatland. Additionally, peat is often sold for compost. Restoration of degraded peatlands can be done by blocking drainage channels in the peatland, and allowing natural vegetation to recover.

Mangroves, salt marshes and seagrasses (collectively called "blue carbon") make up the majority of the ocean's vegetated habitats. They only equal 0.05% of the plant biomass on land, but store carbon 40 times faster than tropical forests. Bottom trawling, dredging for coastal development and fertilizer runoff have damaged coastal habitats. Notably, 85% of oyster reefs globally have been removed in the last two centuries. Oyster reefs clean the water and make other species thrive, thus increasing biomass in that area. In addition, oyster reefs mitigate the effects of climate change by reducing the force of waves from hurricanes and reduce the erosion from rising sea levels. Restoration of coastal wetlands is thought to be more cost-effective than restoration of inland wetlands.

Bioenergy with carbon capture and storage 

Bioenergy with carbon capture and storage (BECCS) is the process of extracting bioenergy from biomass and capturing and storing the carbon, thereby removing it from the atmosphere. The carbon in the biomass comes from the greenhouse gas carbon dioxide (CO2) which is extracted from the atmosphere by the biomass when it grows. Energy is extracted in useful forms (electricity, heat, biofuels, etc.) as the biomass is utilized through combustion, fermentation, pyrolysis or other conversion methods. Some of the carbon in the biomass is converted to CO2 or biochar which can then be stored by geologic sequestration or land application, respectively, enabling carbon dioxide removal (CDR) and making BECCS a negative emissions technology (NET).

The potential range of negative emissions from BECCS was estimated in 2018 as 0 to 22 giga tonnes per year. , approximately 2 million tonnes per year of CO2 was being captured annually. Wide deployment of BECCS is constrained by cost and availability of biomass.

BECCS currently forms a big part of achieving climate targets beyond 2050 in modelling, such as by the Integrated Assessment Models (IAMs) associated with the IPCC process, but many scientists are very skeptical due the risk of loss of biodiversity and increases in food prices.

Ocean-based options 

In principle, carbon can be stored in ocean reservoirs. This can be done with "ocean-based mitigation systems" including ocean fertilization, ocean alkalinity enhancement or enhanced weathering. Blue carbon management is partly an ocean-based method and partly a land-based method. Most of these options could also help to reduce ocean acidification, the drop in pH value caused by increased atmospheric CO2 concentrations.

The current assessment of potential for ocean-based mitigation options is in 2022 that they have only "limited current deployment", but "moderate to large future mitigation potentials" in future.

Enhanced weathering is a process that aims to accelerate the natural weathering by spreading finely ground silicate rock, such as basalt, onto surfaces which speeds up chemical reactions between rocks, water, and air. It removes removes carbon dioxide from the atmosphere, permanently storing it in solid carbonate minerals or ocean alkalinity.

Blue carbon management

Technologies to capture carbon dioxide 

Artificial processes vary, and concerns have been expressed about the long-term effects of some of these processes.
 Carbon capture and storage (CCS) is a method to mitigate climate change by capturing carbon dioxide (CO2) from large point sources, such as cement factories or biomass power plants, and subsequently storing it away safely instead of releasing it into the atmosphere. The IPCC estimates that the costs of halting global warming would double without CCS. Norway's Sleipner gas field, beginning in 1996, stores almost a million tons of CO2 a year to avoid penalties in producing natural gas with unusually high levels of CO2.

Demand reduction 

Demand of products and services which cause greenhouse gas emissions can be reduced in three different ways. Firstly, demand can be reduced by behavioural and cultural changes, for instance changes in diet. Secondly, demand for energy and other emitting services can be reduced by improved infrastructure, such as a good public transport network. Lastly, changes in end-use technology can reduce energy demand (e.g., a well-insulated house emits less than a poorly-insulated house). 

Mitigation options that reduce demand for products or services are helping people make personal choices to reduce their carbon footprint, for example in their choice of transport options or their diets. This means there are many social aspects with the demand-side mitigation actions. For example, people with high socio-economic status often contribute more to greenhouse gas emissions than those from a lower socio-economic status. By reducing their emissions and promoting green policies, these people could become "role models of low-carbon lifestyles". However, there are many psychological variables that influence motivation of people to reduce their demand such as awareness and perceived risk. Government policies can support or hinder demand-site mitigation options. For example, public policy can promote circular economy concepts which would support climate change mitigation. Reducing greenhouse gas emissions is linked to sharing economy and circular economy.

Energy conservation and efficiency

Global primary energy demand exceeded 161,000 TWh in 2018. This refers to electricity, transport and heating including all losses. In transport and electricity production, fossil fuel usage has a low efficiency of less than 50%. Large amounts of heat in power plants and in motors of vehicles are wasted. The actual amount of energy consumed is significantly lower at 116,000 TWh.

Energy conservation is the effort made to reduce the consumption of energy by using less of an energy service. This can be achieved either by using energy more efficiently (using less energy for a constant service) or by reducing the amount of service used (for example, by driving less). Energy conservation is at the top of the sustainable energy hierarchy. Energy can be conserved by reducing wastage and losses, improving efficiency through technological upgrades, and improved operations and maintenance.

Efficient energy use, sometimes simply called energy efficiency, is the process of reducing the amount of energy required to provide products and services. Improved energy efficiency in buildings ("green buildings"), industrial processes and transportation could reduce the world's energy needs in 2050 by one third, and thus help reduce global emissions of greenhouse gases. For example, insulating a building allows it to use less heating and cooling energy to achieve and maintain thermal comfort. Improvements in energy efficiency are generally achieved by adopting a more efficient technology or production process or by application of commonly accepted methods to reduce energy losses.

Lifestyle changes 
 Individual action on climate change can include personal choices in many areas, such as diet, travel, household energy use, consumption of goods and services, and family size. People who wish to reduce their carbon footprint (particularly those in high income countries with high consumption lifestyles), can take "high-impact" actions, such as avoiding frequent flying and petrol fuelled cars, eating mainly a plant-based diet, having fewer children, using clothes and electrical products for longer, and electrifying homes. Excessive consumption is more to blame for climate change than population increase. High consumption lifestyles have a greater environmental impact, with the richest 10% of people emitting about half the total lifestyle emissions. As an example of a way to mitigate climate change, 64% of EU respondents to a survey favored higher taxes on polluting activities like air travel and SUVs to reflect their environmental costs.

Dietary change 

Avoiding meat and dairy foods has been called "the single biggest way" an individual can reduce their environmental impact. The widespread adoption of a vegetarian diet could cut food-related greenhouse gas emissions by 63% by 2050. China introduced new dietary guidelines in 2016 which aim to cut meat consumption by 50% and thereby reduce greenhouse gas emissions by 1billion tonnes by 2030.
Overall, food accounts for the largest share of consumption-based greenhouse gas emissions with nearly 20% of the global carbon footprint. Almost 15% of all anthropogenic greenhouse gas emissions has been attributed to the livestock sector.

A shift towards plant-based diets would help to mitigate climate change. In particular, reducing meat consumption would help to reduce methane emissions.

Family size 
 Population growth has resulted in higher greenhouse gas emissions in most regions, particularly Africa. However, economic growth has a bigger effect than population growth.It is the rising incomes, changes in consumption and dietary patterns, together with population growth, which causes pressure on land and other natural resources, and leads to more greenhouse gas emissions and less carbon sinks. Scholars have pointed out that "In concert with policies that end fossil fuel use and incentivize sustainable consumption, humane policies that slow population growth should be part of a multifaceted climate response." It is known that "advances in female education and reproductive health, especially voluntary family planning, can contribute greatly to reducing world population growth".

Investment and finance

Investment 

More than 1000 organizations with a worth of US$8 trillion have made commitments to fossil fuel divestment. Socially responsible investing funds allow investors to invest in funds that meet high environmental, social and corporate governance (ESG) standards.

There are lists to show the business organisations which are the "top contributors to greenhouse gas emissions". Asset management firms are often identified as controllers of large amounts of contemporary financial value with insufficient dedication to climate change targets, with the largest four asset managers controlling around 20% of the world's listed market values – an aggregate assets under management of $20 trillion as of 2021.

Funding
In order to reconcile economic development with mitigating carbon emissions, developing countries need particular support, both financial and technical. One of the means of achieving this is the Kyoto Protocol's Clean Development Mechanism (CDM). The World Bank's Prototype Carbon Fund is a public private partnership that operates within the CDM. However, none of these initiatives suggest a quantitative cap on the emissions from developing countries. This is considered as a particularly difficult policy proposal as the economic growth of developing countries are proportionally reflected in the growth of greenhouse emissions.

An important point of contention is how overseas development assistance not directly related to climate change mitigation is affected by funds provided to climate change mitigation. One of the outcomes of the UNFCC Copenhagen Climate Conference was the Copenhagen Accord, in which developed countries promised to provide US$30 million between 2010 and 2012 of new and additional resources. Yet it remains unclear what exactly the definition of "additional" is.

Carbon pricing 

Additional costs on greenhouse gas emissions can lower competitiveness of fossil fuels and accelerate investments into low-carbon sources of energy. A growing number of countries raise a fixed carbon tax or participate in dynamic carbon emission trading (ETS) systems. In 2021, more than 21% of global greenhouse gas emissions were covered by a carbon price, a major increase due to the introduction of the Chinese national carbon trading scheme.

Trading schemes offer the possibility to limit emission allowances to certain reduction targets. However, an oversupply of allowances keeps most ETS at low price levels around $10 with a low impact. This includes the Chinese ETS which started with $7/t in 2021. One exception is the European Union Emission Trading Scheme where prices began to rise in 2018, reaching about €80/t in 2022. This results in additional costs of about €0.04/KWh for coal and €0.02/KWh for gas combustion for electricity, depending on the emission intensity.

2021 models of the social cost of carbon calculated a damage of more than $3000 per ton  as a result of economy feedbacks and falling global GDP growth rates, while policy recommendations for a carbon price ranged from about $50 to $200.

Industries which have high energy requirements and high emissions often pay only very low energy taxes, or even none at all.

Methane emissions from fossil fuel extraction are occasionally taxed, but methane and nitrous oxide from agriculture are typically left untaxed.

Cost estimates 

Mitigation cost estimates depend on the baseline (in this case, a reference scenario that the alternative scenario is compared with), the way costs are modelled, and assumptions about future government policy. Cost estimates for mitigation for specific regions are dependent on the quantity of emissions "allowed" for that region in future, as well as the timing of interventions.

Mitigation costs will vary according to how and when emissions are cut: early, well-planned action will minimise the costs. Globally, the benefits of keeping warming under 2 °C exceed the costs.

Many economists estimate the cost of climate change mitigation at between 1% and 2% of GDP. One 2018 estimate stated that temperature increase can be limited to 1.5 °C for 1.7 trillion dollars a year. According to this study, a global investment of approximately $1.7 trillion per year would have been needed to keep global warming below 1.5°C. Whereas this is a large sum, it is still far less than the subsidies governments provided to the ailing fossil fuel industry, estimated at more than $5 trillion per year by the International Monetary Fund. However by the end of 2022 many thought limiting to 1.5 °C politically impossible.

The economic repercussions of mitigation vary widely across regions and households, depending on policy design and level of international cooperation. Delayed global cooperation increases policy costs across regions, especially in those that are relatively carbon intensive at present. Pathways with uniform carbon values show higher mitigation costs in more carbon-intensive regions, in fossil-fuels exporting regions and in poorer regions. Aggregate quantifications expressed in GDP or monetary terms undervalue the economic effects on households in poorer countries; the actual effects on welfare and well-being are comparatively larger.

Cost–benefit analysis may be unsuitable for analysing climate change mitigation as a whole but still useful for analysing the difference between a 1.5 °C target and 2 °C. One way of estimating the cost of reducing emissions is by considering the likely costs of potential technological and output changes. Policy makers can compare the marginal abatement costs of different methods to assess the cost and amount of possible abatement over time. The marginal abatement costs of the various measures will differ by country, by sector, and over time.

Distributing emissions abatement costs 
Mitigation at the speed and scale required to likely limit warming to 2 °C or below implies deep economic and structural changes, thereby raising multiple types of distributional concerns across regions, income classes and sectors.

There have been different proposals on how to allocate responsibility for cutting emissions: Egalitarianism, basic needs (as defined according to a minimum level of consumption), proportionality and polluter-pays principle. A specific proposal is the "equal per capita entitlements". This approach can be divided into two categories. In the first category, emissions are allocated according to national population. In the second category, emissions are allocated in a way that attempts to account for historical (cumulative) emissions.

Avoided costs of climate change effects 

By limiting climate change, some of the costs of the effects of climate change can be avoided. According to the Stern Review, inaction can be as high as the equivalent of losing at least 5% of global gross domestic product (GDP) each year, now and forever (up to 20% of the GDP or more when including a wider range of risks and impacts), whereas mitigating climate change will only cost about 2% of the GDP.
Also, delaying to take significant reductions in greenhouse gas emissions may not be a good idea, when seen from a financial perspective.

Mitigation solutions are often evaluated in terms of costs and greenhouse gas reduction potentials, missing out on the consideration of direct effects on human well-being.

Policies and actors

Municipal policies and urban planning 

Cities have big potential for reducing greenhouse gas emissions. They emitted 28 GtCO2-eq in 2020 of combined CO2 and CH4 emissions. This was "through the production and consumption of goods and services". Climate-smart urban planning aims to reduce sprawl to reduce the distance travelled, thus lowering emissions from transportation. It supports mixed use of space, transit, walking, cycling, sharing vehicles can reduce urban emissions. Urban forestry, lakes and other blue and green infrastructure can reduce emissions directly and indirectly by reduced energy demand for cooling. Personal cars are extremely inefficient at moving passengers, while public transport and bicycles are many times more efficient in an urban context. Switching from cars by improving walkability and cycling infrastructure is either free or beneficial to a country's economy as a whole. Methane emissions from municipal solid waste can be reduced by segregation, composting, and recycling.

National policies 
Climate change mitigation policies can have a large and complex impact, both positive and negative, on the socio-economic status of individuals and countries. Without "well-designed and inclusive policies, climate change mitigation measures can place a higher financial burden on poor households."

The most effective and economically efficient approach of achieving lower emissions in the energy sector is to apply a combination of market-based instruments (taxes, permits), standards, and information policies.

Many countries are aiming for net zero emissions, and many have either carbon taxes or carbon emission trading. As of 2021, three countries are carbon negative, meaning they remove from the atmosphere more greenhouse gas emissions then they emit. These countries; Bhutan, Suriname and Panama; formed a small coalition at the 2021 United Nations Climate Change Conference and asked for help so that other countries will join it.

Types of national policies that would support climate change mitigation include:
 Regulatory standards: These set technology or performance standards, and can be effective in addressing the market failure of informational barriers. If the costs of regulation are less than the benefits of addressing the market failure, standards can result in net benefits. One example are fuel-efficiency standards for cars.
 Market-based instruments such as emission taxes and charges: an emissions tax requires domestic emitters to pay a fixed fee or tax for every tonne of CO2-eq GHG emissions released into the atmosphere. If every emitter were to face the same level of tax, the lowest cost way of achieving emission reductions in the economy would be undertaken first. In the real world, however, markets are not perfect, meaning that an emissions tax may deviate from this ideal. Distributional and equity considerations usually result in differential tax rates for different sources.
 Tradable permits: Emissions can be limited with a permit system. A number of permits are distributed equal to the emission limit, with each liable entity required to hold the number of permits equal to its actual emissions. A tradable permit system can be cost-effective so long as transaction costs are not excessive, and there are no significant imperfections in the permit market and markets relating to emitting activities.
 Voluntary agreements: These are agreements between government (public agencies) and industry. Agreements may relate to general issues, such as research and development, but in other cases, quantitative targets may be agreed upon. There is, however, the risk that participants in the agreement will free ride, either by not complying with the agreement or by benefitting from the agreement while bearing no cost.
 Informational instruments: Poor information is recognized as a barrier to improved energy efficiency or reduced emissions. Examples of policies in this area include increasing public awareness of energy saving with home heating and insulation or emissions from meat and dairy products. However some say that for a politician asking people to eat less meat is "politically toxic".
 Research and development policies: Some areas, such as soil, may differ by country and so need national research. Technologies may need financial support to reach commercial scale, for example floating wind power.
 Low carbon power: Governments may relax planning regulations on solar power and onshore wind, and may partly finance technologies considered risky by the private sector, such as nuclear.
 Demand-side management: This aims to reduce energy demand, e.g., through energy audits, labelling, and regulation.
 Adding or removing subsidies:
 A subsidy for greenhouse gas emissions reductions pays entities a specific amount per tonne of CO2-eq for every tonne of greenhouse gas reduced or sequestered. Although subsidies are generally less efficient than taxes, distributional and competitiveness issues sometimes result in energy/emission taxes being coupled with subsidies or tax exceptions.
 Creating subsidies and financial incentives: for example energy subsidies to support clean generation which is not yet commercially viable such as tidal power.
 Phasing-out of unhelpful subsidies: Many countries provide subsidies for activities that impact emissions, e.g., subsidies in the agriculture and energy sectors, and indirect subsidies for transport. Specific example agricultural subsidies for cattle or fossil fuel subsidies
 A Green Marshall Plan, which  calls for global central bank money creation to fund green infrastructure,
 Market liberalization: Restructuring of energy markets has occurred in several countries and regions. These policies have mainly been designed to increase competition in the market, but they can have a significant impact on emissions.

Phasing out fossil fuel subsidies

International agreements 

Almost all countries are parties to the United Nations Framework Convention on Climate Change (UNFCCC). The ultimate objective of the UNFCCC is to stabilize atmospheric concentrations of greenhouse gases at a level that would prevent dangerous human interference with the climate system.

Paris Agreement 

The Paris Agreement has become the main current international agreement on combating climate change. Each country must determine, plan, and regularly report on the contribution that it undertakes to mitigate global warming. Climate change mitigation measures can be written down in national environmental policy documents like the nationally determined contributions (NDC). The Paris agreement succeeds the 1997 Kyoto Protocol which expired in 2020. Countries that ratified the Kyoto protocol committed to reduce their emissions of carbon dioxide and five other greenhouse gases, or engage in emissions trading if they maintain or increase emissions of these gases.

In 2015, two official UNFCCC scientific expert bodies came to the conclusion that, "in some regions and vulnerable ecosystems, high risks are projected even for warming above 1.5 °C". This expert position was, together with the strong diplomatic voice of the poorest countries and the island nations in the Pacific, the driving force leading to the decision of the Paris Conference 2015, to lay down this 1.5 °C long-term target on top of the existing 2 °C goal.

Additional commitments 
In addition to the main agreements, there are many additional pledges made by international coalitions, countries, cities, regions and businesses. According to a report published in September 2019 before the 2019 UN Climate Action Summit, full implementation of all pledges, including those in the Paris Agreement, will be sufficient to limit temperature rise to 2 degrees but not to 1.5 degrees. After the report was published, additional pledges were made in the September climate summit and in December of that year.

In December 2020 another climate action summit was held and important commitments were made. The organizers stated that, including the commitments expected in the beginning of the following year, countries representing 70% of the global economy will be committed to reach zero emissions by 2050.

In September 2021 the US and EU launched the Global Methane Pledge to cut methane emissions by 30% by 2030. UK, Argentina, Indonesia, Italy and Mexico joined the initiative, "while Ghana and Iraq signaled interest in joining, according to a White House summary of the meeting, which noted those countries represent six of the top 15 methane emitters globally". Israel also joined the initiative

Although not designed for this purpose, the Montreal Protocol has benefited climate change mitigation efforts. The Montreal Protocol is an international treaty that has successfully reduced emissions of ozone-depleting substances (for example, CFCs), which are also greenhouse gases.

History 

Historically climate change has been approached at a multinational level where a consensus decision is reached at the United Nations (UN), under the United Nations Framework Convention on Climate Change (UNFCCC). This represents the dominant approach historically of engaging as many international governments as possible in taking action in on a worldwide public issue. There is a precedent that this model can work, as seen in the Montreal Protocol in 1987. The top-down framework of only utilizing the UNFCCC consensus approach has been proposed to be ineffective, with counter proposals of bottom up governance and decreasing the emphasis of the UNFCCC.

The Kyoto Protocol to the UNFCCC (adopted in 1997) set out legally binding emission reduction commitments for the "Annex B" countries.  The Protocol defined three international policy instruments ("Flexibility Mechanisms") which could be used by the Annex B countries to meet their emission reduction commitments. According to Bashmakov, use of these instruments could significantly reduce the costs for Annex B countries in meeting their emission reduction commitments.

The European Union's mitigation target for 2020 was: Reduce greenhouse gas emissions by 20% from the level in 1990, produce 20% of energy from renewable sources, increase Energy Efficiency by 20%. The European Union claims that they have already achieved the 2020 target for emission reduction and have the legislation needed to achieve the 2030 targets. Already in 2018, its greenhouse gas emissions were 23% lower than those in 1990.

Society and culture

Barriers 

Barriers to achieving climate change mitigation can be grouped into individual, institutional and market barriers. They differ for all the different mitigation options, regions and societies.

Complicated issues around accounting of carbon dioxide removal can act as economic barriers, for example with regards to BECCS (Bioenergy with carbon capture and storage). The strategies that companies follow can act as a barrier but also as an "accelerator of decarbonisation".

In order to "decarbonise societies" the state (government) needs to play a predominant role because this requires a massive coordination effort. This strong government role, however, can only work well if there is social cohesion, political stability and trust.

For land-based mitigation options, finance is a major barrier, followed by "cultural values, governance, accountability and institutional capacity" as other barriers.

For developing countries, additional barriers to mitigation include:

 The cost of capital increased in the early 2020s. A lack of available capital and finance is common in developing countries. Together with the absence of regulatory standards, this barrier supports the proliferation of inefficient equipment.
 There are also financial and capacity barrier in many of these countries.

It has been estimated that only 0.12% of all funding for climate-related research is spent on the social science of climate change mitigation. Vastly more funding is spent on natural science studies of climate change and considerable sums are also spent on studies of impact of and adaptation to climate change.

Risks 
Mitigation measures can also have negative side effects and risks. In agriculture and forestry, mitigation measures can affect biodiversity and ecosystem functioning. In the area of renewable energies, mining for metals and minerals can increase mining threats to conservation areas. To address one of these issues, there is research into ways to recycle solar panels and electronic waste in order to create a source for materials that would otherwise need to be mined.

Discussions about risks and negative side effects of mitigation measures can "lead to deadlock or a sense that there are intractable obstacles to taking action".

Impacts of the COVID-19 pandemic 

The COVID-19 pandemic led some governments to shift their focus away from climate action, at least temporarily.
Decreased human activity during the pandemic diverted attention from ongoing activities such as accelerated deforestation of the Amazon rainforest. Invasive species and other outbreaks and disturbances have become more common in forests in the last several decades. These tend to be directly or indirectly connected to climate change and have negative consequences for forest ecosystems. The hindrance of environmental policy efforts, combined with economic slowdown may have contributed to slowed investment in green energy technologies. 

In 2020, carbon dioxide emissions fell by 6.4% or 2.3 billion tonnes globally. Greenhouse gas emissions rebounded later in the pandemic as many countries began lifting restrictions, with the direct impact of pandemic policies having a negligible long-term impact on climate change.

Examples by country

United States

China 

In 2020, China committed to peak emissions by 2030 and reach net zero by 2060; following the 2021 blackouts, officials indicated the 2030 target was something "to strive to" and not necessarily to be met.  In order to limit warming to 1.5 °C coal plants in China without carbon capture must be phased out by 2045. The Chinese national carbon trading scheme started in 2021.

European Union 

The climate commitments of the European Union were divided into three main categories: targets for the year 2020 (now obsolete), for 2030 and for 2050. The European Union state that their policies are in line with the goal of the Paris Agreement.
 Targets for 2030: Reduce greenhouse gas emission by 40% from the level of 1990. In 2019 The European Parliament adopted a resolution upgrading the target to 55%, produce 32% of energy from renewables, increase energy efficiency by 32.5%.
 Target for 2050: become climate neutral.
The European Investment Fund has committed €250 million in collaboration with five equity funds to raise €2.5 billion in climate action and environmental sustainability investment across Europe. The funds will be used to invest in food innovation, water, renewable energy, energy efficiency, the circular economy, and a sustainable economy.

See also 

 Attribution of recent climate change
 Carbon budget
 Climate movement
 Climate change denial
 Nature-based solutions
 Tipping points in the climate system

References 

 
Biogeochemical cycle
Biogeography
Cycle
Chemical oceanography
Climate change policy
Geochemistry
Numerical climate and weather models
Soil